Neil Weare (born 20 June 1980) is a Guam middle-distance runner. He competed in the men's 1500 metres at the 2004 Summer Olympics.

References

External links
 

1980 births
Living people
Athletes (track and field) at the 2004 Summer Olympics
Guamanian male middle-distance runners
Olympic track and field athletes of Guam
Place of birth missing (living people)